Naval Kishore Vikram (born 1970) is an Indian physician, diabetologist and a professor at the department of medicine of the All India Institute of Medical Sciences, Delhi (AIIMS Delhi). He is known for his studies in the field of metabolic disorders with special emphasis on insulin resistance and obesity and his work assisted in profiling the Indian population with regard to imbalanced dietary practices and cardiovascular risk factors. He was a member of the group which proposed guidelines for obesity management, metabolic syndrome, and dietary controls for Asian Indians. His studies have been documented by way of a number of articles and ResearchGate, an online repository of scientific articles has listed 125 of them.

A member of the Institute Ethics Committee of AIIMS Delhi, Vikram received the NASI-Scopus Young Scientist Award in 2010. The Department of Biotechnology of the Government of India awarded him the National Bioscience Award for Career Development, one of the highest Indian science awards, for his contributions to biosciences, in 2012. He is also a recipient of the AIIMS Excellence Award, which he received in 2013.

Selected bibliography

See also 

 Encephalitis
 Sepsis

Notes

References

External links 
 

N-BIOS Prize recipients
Indian scientific authors
Living people
Medical doctors from Delhi
Indian medical researchers
Indian diabetologists
Academic staff of the All India Institute of Medical Sciences, New Delhi
1970 births